The Waipapa River is a river of the Northland Region of New Zealand's North Island. It flows generally southwest to reach the Whakanekeneke River 12 kilometres northwest of Lake Ōmāpere.

See also
List of rivers of New Zealand

References

Rivers of the Northland Region
Rivers of New Zealand